The Phelps County Courthouse is a historic building in Holdrege, Nebraska, and the county courthouse for Phelps County, Nebraska. It was built in 1910–1911. It was designed in the Beaux Arts style by architect William F. Gernandt. It has been listed on the National Register of Historic Places since January 10, 1990.

References

	
National Register of Historic Places in Phelps County, Nebraska
Beaux-Arts architecture in Nebraska
Government buildings completed in 1910